The 1998 Parramatta Eels season was the 52nd in the club's history. Coached by Brian Smith and captained by Dean Pay they competed in the National Rugby League's 1998 Premiership season.

Summary
Parramatta finished fourth in the newly created 20-team NRL. Parramatta had a highly successful finals series, beating the North Sydney Bears in a Qualifying Final and then backing up to defeat eventual premiers the Brisbane Broncos 15–10 at ANZ Stadium in Brisbane. Due to the win, Parramatta gained a week off before clashing with arch-rivals Canterbury in the Grand Final Qualifier.

The game was poised at 18–2 in favour of Parramatta with 11 minutes to go. However, Canterbury managed a late resurgence scoring three tries in eight minutes to tie the game up at 18–18 with Daryl Halligan kicking two side line conversions which took the game into extra-time. The extra-time period is remembered for the performance of Parramatta player Paul Carige who made three crucial errors. Parramatta would go on to lose 32-20 in extra-time.

Standings

Awards
Club man of the year: Stuart Kelly
Players' player: Jason Smith
Coach's award: Nathan Cayless
Rookie of the year: Nathan Hindmarsh

References

Parramatta Eels seasons
Parramatta Eels season